Sint-Maria-Oudenhove is a village in the Denderstreek and in the Flemish Ardennes, the hilly southern part of the province of East Flanders, Belgium.

It was formerly an independent municipality. In 1977 the main part of the settlement became part of the municipality of Zottegem, with a smaller section joining the municipality of Brakel.

History
From the middle of the 12th century, Sint-Maria-Oudenhove was part of the Land of Aalst in loan by the Lords of Zotegem. In 1675, it became a barony. 

The original castle was plundered and set on fire by the troops of Louis XIV during the War of Devolution in 1667. The castle was rebuilt in the late 17th century. In 1933, the castle was bought by the sisters of Saint Francis of Opbrakel and turned into a girl boarding school. The castle is still in use as a school.

During the 20th century, Sint-Maria-Oudenhove became mainly a commuter's community. In 1977, most of the municipality merged into Zottegem with a small area awarded to Brakel.

Gallery

References

External links
 

Brakel
Zottegem
Populated places in East Flanders
Former municipalities of East Flanders